American Musical Supply (AMS) is a privately owned musical instrument retailer and wholesale supplier based in Oakland, New Jersey.  They sell electric and acoustic guitars, amplifiers, live sound speakers, DJ gear, recording equipment, drums, keyboard instruments, and a wide assortment of accessories to customers living in the United States and its territories.  Its web site is ranked as one of the top 500 retail web sites by volume by the journal Internet Retailer.  American Musical Supply began as the catalog and Internet division of a Bergen County music business named Victor's House of Music.  When Victor's was leased by competing retailer Guitar Center in 2007, the former Victor's owners retained control of AMS and continue to operate it as a mail order and web business.

Awards 
2016, On-Stage Dealer of the Year
2017, Bizrate Circle of Excellence Platinum Award Winner

References

External links
Official website

Musical instrument retailers of the United States
Companies based in Bergen County, New Jersey